István Juhász may refer to:
István Juhász (footballer) (born 1945), Hungarian football midfielder
István Juhász (boxer) (born 1931), Hungarian boxer
István Juhász (mathematician) (born 1943), Hungarian mathematician